Little Gables is an unincorporated community in Miami-Dade County, Florida. The name "Little Gables" comes from the community being located between the cities of Coral Gables and Miami.

Geography
Little Gables is bordered by Coral Gables on the east, west and south, and by the Miami neighborhood of Flagami on the north.

History
There have been proposals for Coral Gables to annex Little Gables for several decades prior to 2018. An attempt at annexation was made in 2018-19 which ultimately failed due to the lack of alternative affordable housing for residents of a trailer park in the community which Coral Gables wished to redevelop.

Demographics
As of 2018, Little Gables, High Pines and Ponce-Davis (all unincorporated areas which Coral Gables was attempting to annex) had a combined population of about 5,490.

References

Unincorporated communities in Miami-Dade County, Florida
Unincorporated communities in Florida